Jules Danilo (born 18 May 1995) is an Italian-born French motorcycle racer. He has competed in the French 125cc/Moto3 championship – twice finishing as runner-up in the series –, the CEV Moto3 series, the Moto3 World Championship, the Moto2 World Championship and the Supersport World Championship.

Career statistics

Grand Prix motorcycle racing

By season

Races by year
(key) (Races in bold indicate pole position, races in italics indicate fastest lap)

Supersport World Championship

Races by year
(key) (Races in bold indicate pole position, races in italics indicate fastest lap)

References

External links
 

1995 births
Living people
French motorcycle racers
Moto3 World Championship riders
Sportspeople from Milan
Moto2 World Championship riders
Supersport World Championship riders